Clive Boughton (born 4 August 1956) is an Australian computer science professor residing in Canberra, in the Australian Capital Territory. He is a senior lecturer in the Faculty of Engineering and Information Technology at the Australian National University. He is the managing director of Software Improvements Pty Ltd.

Professional career
Before completing his BSc Boughton undertook both research (at ARRB Group Ltd.) and industrial practice (at USL as Lab Manager) concerning the physical properties of soils. He published a paper on the soil compacting properties of rollers for road-making. Boughton obtained his BSc (applied physics) from RMIT University in Melbourne in 1976.

After completing his BSc he became a professional officer at the department of physics at Monash University in Melbourne where did research into the specific heat of superconducting alloys. He published a research paper on the Fe(3-x)Mn(x)Si category of superconducting compounds/alloys as a result of his work at Monash.

Boughton began his PhD at Australian National University in 1981 and began studying gaseous dynamics. He obtained his PhD in molecular physics in 1988.

Further afield
Boughton left the university environment to take a senior software engineering position at C3 in 1984. He worked at several other companies, including his own, before accepting a Visiting Fellow position in the Department of Computer Science at Australian National University in 1995,
eventually becoming a full-time member of the department in 2000.

Boughton was a contributor to the establishment of the BS Eng degree program within Department of Computer Science/Faculty of Engineering and Information Technology.

He was involved in eVACS (Electronic voting and counting), a computer system that provides for electronic voting and electronic counting for ACT Legislative Assembly elections. It provides for counting according to the Hare-Clark electoral system rules set out in the Electoral Act 1992. He was involved in requirements identification and design.

See also
Executable UML

References

External links
 "eVACS" https://web.archive.org/web/20070708225404/http://www.elections.act.gov.au/EVACS.html 
 http://conferences.oreillynet.com/cs/os2004/view/e_sess/5512 "Presentation of Election Software", 30 July 2001, Oreillynet.com. Retrieved 10 July 2007.
 http://crpit.com/confpapers/CRPITV30Flint.pdf Paper on Executable/Translatable UML in computing education
 https://web.archive.org/web/20070908200638/http://www.crpit.com/confpapers/CRPITV15Boughton.pdf Paper "Beginning to Define a Body of Knowledge for Safety Practitioners"

Academic staff of the Australian National University
1956 births
Living people